Sergey Vladimirovich Novikov (born August 28, 1980 in Dolinsk, Soviet Union) is a Russian cross-country skier who has competed since 1999. His lone World Cup victory was in a 4 × 10 km event in Switzerland in 2007 while Novikov's best individual finish was third in a 15 km event in Estonia the previous year.

Competing in three Winter Olympics, his best finish was sixth in the 4 × 10 km relay at Salt Lake City in 2002. Novikov's best finish at the FIS Nordic World Ski Championships was fourth in the 4 × 10 km relay at Val di Fiemme in 2003.

Cross-country skiing results
All results are sourced from the International Ski Federation (FIS).

Olympic Games

World Championships

World Cup

Individual podiums
1 podium – (1 )

Team podiums
 1 victory – (1 )
 2 podiums – (2 )

References

Sports-Reference.com profile

External links

1980 births
Living people
People from Sakhalin Oblast
Cross-country skiers at the 2002 Winter Olympics
Cross-country skiers at the 2006 Winter Olympics
Cross-country skiers at the 2010 Winter Olympics
Olympic cross-country skiers of Russia
Russian male cross-country skiers
Universiade medalists in cross-country skiing
Universiade gold medalists for Russia
Competitors at the 2001 Winter Universiade
Sportspeople from Sakhalin Oblast